Paiwana is a small genus of east Asian cellar spiders named after the Paiwan people. The genus was erected in 2018 for two species transferred from Pholcus after a molecular phylogenetic study of Pholcidae. Males are distinguished by unique sclerotized modifications to the chelicerae, and females by the unique triangular epigynum shape.  it contains only two species, both native to Taiwan: P. chengpoi and P. pingtung.

See also
 Pholcus
 List of Pholcidae species

References

Pholcidae genera
Spiders of Taiwan